Debi Towns (born February 12, 1956) is an American Republican politician from Wisconsin.

Born in Sycamore, Illinois, Towns received her master's degree from the University of Wisconsin–Whitewater and her doctorate from Cardinal Stritch University in Milwaukee. Towns served in the Wisconsin State Assembly 2003-2007 and was defeated for reelection in 2006.

Notes

People from Sycamore, Illinois
Cardinal Stritch University alumni
University of Wisconsin–Oshkosh alumni
Members of the Wisconsin State Assembly
Women state legislators in Wisconsin
1956 births
Living people
21st-century American politicians
21st-century American women politicians